The National Camps Corporation was a British government-funded non-profit organisation established under the Camps Act 1939. The role of the corporation was to construct and administer camps in the countryside that could be used for educational experiences.

Origins
In the context of preparations for war, a Camps Act was passed in April 1939, which provided for the construction of government-financed camps for use as educational holiday centres for children during peacetime, and as camps for evacuees during war. The Act prompted the creation of the National Camps Corporation to oversee these camps. Lord Portal was given the task of chairing the corporation. The initial funding given to the corporation was £1.2 million, half of which was as a loan.

Construction of the camps
The government's expectation was that the corporation would construct fifty camps, but in reality only 31 were built in England and Wales, with a further five in Scotland. The cessation of the construction of new camps was mainly due to the increased costs as a result of war, and the realisation that such camps were not a completely adequate solution to the problem of evacuation. The sites were chosen by Lord Portal and members of the board, out of an original short-list of 155, although some of these sites were taken by the Royal Air Force before the corporation could decide on them. The design of each camp was similar, consisting of huts made out of Canadian cedarwood, designed by architect Thomas Smith Tait. Each camp was designed to accommodate approximately 350 children. The average cost of each camp was £25,000.

Wartime and post-war use
During the Second World War these camps were used as schools for evacuated children, run by local education authorities. The first camp to be used in this way was at Kennylands, near Reading. Some modifications were required for this purpose, as the camps had been intended for temporary holiday guests, rather than a semi-permanent population. This had the obvious consequence of reducing the number of evacuees who could be housed at such camps to under 9,000 nationally. Nevertheless, in November 1940 the Minister of Health Malcolm MacDonald described the camps as "one of the most significant pieces of work that Parliament has lent its hand to in recent times".

In the decades following the war, most of these camps were sold to county councils and education authorities for use as schools. Of especial interest is Amber Valley Camp in Derbyshire used by Derby School starting in June 1940 on completion. The boys and masters having previously been located at Overton Hall, near Ashover, where they were all moved on Saturday 2 September by Derby Corporation petrol engine buses. Amber Valley Camp was used for several years by Derby Corporation for children/pupils living in Derby to enjoy the freedom of a very rural countryside for one month at a time. The valley where most of the dormitories, toilet facilities, meeting room, classrooms, laboratories, accommodation for site warden and one master and his family had to be demolished when Severn Trent Water Authority flooded the whole valley to create Ogston Reservoir. The one remaining large building at the top of the valley is now occupied by the Ogston Sailing Club where they have their clubroom, changing facilities, kitchen and bar. This large building had been used from 1940 to 1945 as the main school dining room, 'tuck shop' and masters' (teachers) common room. Built of cedarwood in 1940 the building is still as sound as originally. Most years it hosts a special school reunion of former school pupils who attended Derby School during the years of WWII.

List of National Camps Corporation sites

References

United Kingdom home front during World War II
Organizations established in 1939
1939 establishments in the United Kingdom